Roberto Martínez Felipe (born 1 January 1970), better known as Roberto Álamo, is a Spanish actor who has appeared in more than fifty films since 1996. Álamo won the 2016 Goya Award for Best Actor for his performance as Javier Alfaro in May God Save Us.

Selected filmography

Television

References

External links 

1970 births
Living people
Spanish male film actors
21st-century Spanish male actors